Tremor is a 1995 novel by the British writer Winston Graham. It portrays the effect of the 1960 Agadir earthquake on holidaymakers in Morocco.

References

Bibliography
 Woods, Tim. Who's Who of Twentieth Century Novelists. Routledge, 2008.

1995 British novels
Novels by Winston Graham
Novels set in the 1960s
Novels set in Morocco
Novels based on actual events
Macmillan Publishers books